Nicola Charles is a British-Australian author and actress, known for her role as Sarah Beaumont in Australian soap opera Neighbours.

Career
Charles trained as an actress and dancer in the UK and started her career in British television commercials, having been chosen as the face to launch Coca-Cola's new flagship brand Sprite. She continues in commercials and modelling work to this day but it was not until moving to Australia in the mid 1990s with then boyfriend Scott Michaelson that she landed her first acting role. Having turned up at Grundy Television studios auditioning for game show The Price is Right, Charles was noticed by casting director Jan Russ and invited to read for a part on Neighbours.  

She played Sarah Beaumont, a role that was written for her, off and on from 1995 to 2016. Her profile soared at this point in her career. In the United Kingdom, she was voted by readers to be the 2nd Sexiest Woman in the World in FHM'''s list of the 100 sexiest women in 1998 and again in 1999.

In 2001, Charles finished recording an album called Listening in Colour, which was mixed by prominent sound engineer Chris Lord-Alge in Los Angeles. However, the album was never officially released by the UK division of Mushroom Records.

In 2009, she had a supporting role in comedy film For Christ's Sake, which also features Armin Shimerman and W. Morgan Sheppard. Following a permanent move back to Australia with her three children, Charles has reprised her role on Neighbours twice.

Charles has penned two novels, Click Monkey: Who Do You Trust with Your Kids? (2019, Shield-Maiden Publishing), and The Witches of Toorak'' (2020, Shield-Maiden Publishing). In July 2020 Charles became the CEO and sole owner of Shield-Maiden Publishing.

Personal life
Charles married kickboxing champion Sean Cochrane in March 1993. The relationship soon broke up. On 18 August 2003, Charles married actor Jason Barry, with whom she had two children. The couple split in 2008. On 1 June 2012, Charles married DJ Mark Tabberner in Caulfield. Charles and Tabberner have a son called Archie.

After relocating to Los Angeles, Charles returned to Melbourne in early 2012.

References

External links

Actresses from Worcestershire
Australian people of English descent
Australian people of Brazilian descent
English film actresses
English people of Brazilian descent
English soap opera actresses
English television actresses
People from Bromsgrove
1969 births
Living people